Kubi may be,

Kubi language
Kubi Turkana
Kubi, the Japanese title for the film Judge and Jeopardy

People
John Kubi
Kwabena Appiah-Kubi
Kubi Indi